The 2017 Premier League Asia Trophy was the eighth edition of the Premier League Asia Trophy. Crystal Palace, Liverpool, Leicester City and West Bromwich Albion competed for the Premier League Asia Trophy. It was held in Hong Kong at the Hong Kong Stadium from 19–22 July 2017. It was the first edition with four Premier League teams to compete and therefore not feature a side from the host country.

Liverpool won their first title following their 2–1 victory over Leicester City in the final.

Results

Semi-finals
All kick-off times are local (UTC+08:00).

Third place play-off

Final

Goalscorers

1 goal

 Philippe Coutinho
 Riyad Mahrez
 Luka Milivojević
 Divock Origi
 Jay Rodriguez
 Bakary Sako
 Mohamed Salah
 Islam Slimani
 Dominic Solanke

References

External links

Premier League Asia Trophy
Prem
Asia
2017
July 2017 sports events in Asia